Knut Hjeltnes (born December 8, 1951) is a former college coach and track & field athlete from Norway.

Hjeltnes, who was born in Øystese, has won 20 National Championships; 11 in Discus throw, in 1975, 1976, 1978, 1980–84, 1986, 1988, and 1989; and 9 in Shot Put, in 1975–1978 and 1980–1984.

Hjeltnes was ranked 2nd through 7th in the world in the discus for twelve years from 1976–1988. He still holds the Norwegian national record in discus with 69.62 meters (228 feet, 5 inches), achieved in 1985. He also has a personal best shot put of 20.55 meters (67 feet, 5 inches), achieved in 1980.

He was a 4x Olympian in the discus (1976, 1980-boycott, 1984, 1988). His best Olympic placings were 4th place in 1984, and 7th place in 1976 and 1988. He narrowly missed the medals in 1984, throwing only 18cm short of John Powell’s bronze medal throw. His best World Championship placing was 9th in 1983. His best European Championship placing was 4th in 1986.

He attended Western Maryland College (now McDaniel College), Penn State University and Brigham Young University. While attending BYU, he was coached by former world record holder Jay Silvester.

Hjeltnes is currently ranked #33 on the world all-time list for discus. As a Masters-level athlete, he has an all-time world ranking of 8th in the men's  35-39 age class.

Hjeltnes coached athletes at the United States Military Academy at West Point, NY from 1999 until 2013.  While coaching at USMA West Point, his athletes produced 40 Patriot League Championships, 3 NCAA All-Americans, 30 NCAA Regional Qualifiers, and 2 Academic All-Americans.

Hjeltnes was hired as the throws coach at Auburn University in 2013.

Hjeltnes coached at the NCAA Division I level for about 20 years, producing a number of All-Americans and conference champions. He retired from full-time coaching at the end of the 2016 outdoor season.

Hjeltnes tested positive for anabolic steroids at Bislett Stadium on July 6, 1977, and was suspended. The suspension was reduced on appeal, allowing him to participate in the 1978 European Championships.  He was the first Norwegian ever to test positive. Hjeltnes publicly admitted to have been doping, and he also cooperated with Jan Hedenstad to write a book about it, called Dopet ("Doped"), published in 1979.

Achievements

See also
List of Pennsylvania State University Olympians

References

External links
Associated Press. Star-News. Norwegian Sets Discus Record. May 13, 1979.

1951 births
Living people
Pennsylvania State University alumni
Doping cases in athletics
Norwegian sportspeople in doping cases
Norwegian male discus throwers
Norwegian male shot putters
Athletes (track and field) at the 1976 Summer Olympics
Athletes (track and field) at the 1984 Summer Olympics
Athletes (track and field) at the 1988 Summer Olympics
Olympic athletes of Norway
Goodwill Games medalists in athletics
Competitors at the 1986 Goodwill Games
People from Kvam
Sportspeople from Vestland